Otzberg is a hill and extinct volcano in Hesse, Germany.

Mountains of Hesse